Mohammad Taskeen (born 1 October 1970) is a United Arab Emirati cricketer. He played First-class cricket for the United Arab Emirates national cricket team from 2004 to 2005.

References

External links
 

1970 births
Living people